Max Georg Wilhelm Sievers (11 June 1887 in Berlin – 17 January 1944 in Brandenburg an der Havel) was chairman of the German Freethinkers League, writer and active communist.

Life

Politics
Max Sievers opposed the first world war and was an unwilling participant and suffered an arm injury in 1915. The experiences during the war led him to become politically active. He became a socialist, editing the  Arbeiter-Rats  and joining the Independent Social Democratic Party of Germany (USPD) by 1919 among other things. In 1920, he joined the  Communist Party of Germany (KPD) even serving as a secretary of its headquarters when needed. However, he was strongly critical of the March Action (attempted Putsch) and as a result left the organization for the Kommunistische Arbeitsgemeinschaft, a group of communists who opposed the tactics of the KPD. However, the group began falling apart, and by 1927 Sievers had returned to the Communist party of Germany (KPD). During the post-Reichstag fire crackdown he was placed into "protective custody" and the party was thrown into disarray. Unlike most communist activists, Sievers was released a few months later and left for Belgium. He remained active and advocated bringing about a socialist government in the form of a Soviet Republic to replace the National Socialists.

Freethought
In 1922 he became active in the organization, Union of Freethinkers for Cremation, gaining an administrative position. He started the freethought publication "Der Freidenker" in 1925. In 1927 he was elected as chairman of the German Freethinkers League. By 1930 the organization boasted 600,000 members and took on the new name. Sievers opposed the Nazi government in his freethought articles, writing of the Reichskonkordat as an "alliance" between the Nazi government and the clergy and promoting the idea they be replaced with a Soviet model. He wrote the book "Unser Kampf gegen das Dritte Reich" to outline many of his objections with the third reich.

Death 

Sievers immigrated to the United States in 1939, but he could not get a visa, so he returned to Belgium. He was arrested on 3 June 1943 by the Gestapo, sentenced on 17 November 1943 to death by the Volksgerichtshof, with a former Marxist, Roland Freisler, presiding, for "conspiracy to commit high treason along with favouring the enemy", and beheaded at the guillotine on 17 January 1944 at Brandenburg Prison.

Literature
 Heiner Jestrabek: Max Sievers. Freidenker, Sozialist, Antifaschist (1887–1944), in: Jahrbuch für Forschungen zur Geschichte der Arbeiterbewegung, No. II/2008.

References

Based on the article in the German Wikipedia.

External links
 Max Sievers timeline
 Short biography of Max Sievers

1887 births
1944 deaths
Freethought writers
People from Berlin executed by Nazi Germany
People executed by Nazi Germany by guillotine
Communists in the German Resistance
German Army personnel of World War I